An Emergency Special Session of the United Nations General Assembly is an unscheduled meeting of the United Nations General Assembly to make urgent recommendations on a particular issue. Such recommendations can include collective measures and can include the use of armed force when necessary to maintain or restore international peace and security in the case of a breach of the peace or act of aggression when the United Nations Security Council fails to exercise its responsibility for the maintenance of international peace and security due to lack of unanimity of its permanent ("veto") members.

Under Chapter Five of the Charter of the United Nations, the Security Council is normally entrusted with maintaining international peace and security. However, on 3 November 1950, the General Assembly passed Resolution 377 (Uniting for Peace) which expanded its authority to consider topics that were previously reserved solely for the Security Council. Under the Resolution, if the Security Council cannot come to a decision on an issue due to a lack of unanimity, the General Assembly may hold an emergency special session within 24 hours to consider the same matter.

The mechanism of the emergency special session was created in 1950 by the General Assembly's adoption of its "Uniting for Peace" resolution, which made the necessary changes to the Assembly's Rules of Procedure. The resolution likewise declared that:

... if the Security Council, because of lack of unanimity of the permanent members, fails to exercise its primary responsibility for the maintenance of international peace and security in any case where there appears to be a threat to the peace, breach of the peace, or act of aggression, the General Assembly shall consider the matter immediately with a view to making appropriate recommendations to Members for collective measures, including in the case of a breach of the peace or act of aggression the use of armed force when necessary, to maintain or restore international peace and security. If not in session at the time, the General Assembly may meet in emergency special session within twenty-four hours of the request therefor. Such emergency special session shall be called if requested by the Security Council on the vote of any seven members, or by a majority of the Members of the United Nations...

Emergency special sessions are rare, a fact reflected in that there have been only eleven such sessions in the history of the United Nations. Additionally, most emergency special sessions run for a single session, with the exception of the 7th, 10th and 11th, which have been reconvened four, seventeen, and three times respectively.

Procedure 
The procedure to call an emergency special session are laid out in the Rules of Procedure of the General Assembly. The rules pertaining to emergency special sessions are as follows (as amended by Res. 1991 that increased majority needed from 7 to 9):

 Rule 8(b) – Summoning at the request of the Security Council or Members
 Emergency special sessions can be convened by a vote of nine members of the Security Council, or a majority of United Nations Member States. These sessions must be convened within 24 hours of any votes.
 Rule 9(b) – Request by Members
 Allows any Member State of the United Nations to request the Secretary-General to convene an emergency special session.
 Rule 10 – Notification of session
 Requires the Secretary-General to notify Member States, at least 12 hours in advance, of the opening of an emergency special session convened pursuant to rule 8(b).
 Rule 16 – Agenda
 States that the provisional agenda of an emergency special session shall be communicated to Member States simultaneously with the communication convening the session.
 Rule 19 – Additional items
 During an emergency special session, additional agenda items may be added for consideration by a two-thirds majority of the members present and voting.
 Rule 20 – Explanatory memorandum
 Requires any item proposed for inclusion in the agenda to be accompanied by an explanatory memorandum.

Sessions

References

External links 
 UNGA Emergency Special Sessions